Bruno Santos Gerussi (7 May 1928 – 21 November 1995) was a Canadian stage and television actor, best known for the lead role in the CBC Television series The Beachcombers. He also performed onstage at the Stratford Festival, worked in radio, and hosted CBC's daily television cooking show Celebrity Cooks in the late 1970s.

Early life and education
Gerussi was born in Medicine Hat, Alberta, as the eldest son of Enrico Gerussi, a coal miner working in Lethbridge, who had trained in Italy as a stonemason, and his wife Teresina Lazzorotto. The two married in 1927 and moved to Medicine Hat.  The family subsequently moved to Exshaw, where Enrico worked as a sectionman on the Canadian Pacific Railway.

Bruno Gerussi grew up in Exshaw and later moved with his family to New Westminster, British Columbia. He attended the Banff School of Fine Arts after receiving a scholarship there.  Bruno was just 22 when his father committed suicide by hanging himself in the woods behind the provincial mental hospital at Essondale.

Early career
In 1954, Gerussi joined the Stratford Festival in its second season. During the next few years he went on to act in many stage productions in Canada and the United States, including performing the role of Romeo in the Stratford Festival's first production of Romeo and Juliet in 1960.

Gerussi joined CBC radio, and later appeared on television. One of his earliest TV appearances was as Feste on April 8, 1964 on a CBC-TV production of Twelfth Night. In 1967 and 1968 he hosted a nationally broadcast mid-morning CBC radio show, Gerussi, Words and Music.

The Beachcombers years
Gerussi's best-known role arrived in 1972, when he was signed to play Nick Adonidas in The Beachcombers, a comedy-adventure-drama created by Marc and Susan Strange and set on the west coast of Canada. The Beachcombers ran for 387 episodes between 1972 and 1990 and remains Canada's longest-running weekly dramatic series.

During part of his time with The Beachcombers, Gerussi hosted the CBC cooking program Celebrity Cooks in the late 1970s and most of the 1980s. The series filmed for 12 seasons, with a Monday-to-Friday time slot for most of those years and Gerussi hosted 478 episodes before the show's last season in production, 1987. The Celebrity Cooks episode featured the last public appearance of actor Bob Crane of Hogan's Heroes fame, who was murdered soon afterwards. The taping of Crane's episode was dramatized in the 2002 film Auto Focus, in which actor John Kapelos portrayed Gerussi.

Gerussi's appearances in Celebrity Cooks led him to become commercial spokesperson for a line of microwave ovens in the late-1970s/early-1980s. He appeared in commercials for a variety of food products.

He was the host of the first Genie Awards broadcast in 1980.

After The Beachcombers
On 21 November 1995, Bruno Gerussi died of a heart attack in Vancouver at the home of his companion, Judge Nancy Morrison.

The TV movie The New Beachcombers (2002), was dedicated in his memory. A new series was broadcast from 2002 to 2004.

Awards and recognition
Gerussi received a Gemini Award nomination for Best Performance by a Lead Actor in a Continuing Dramatic Role in 1990 for the final season of The Beachcombers.

He won the Geminis' Earle Grey Award posthumously for lifetime achievement in 1996. His children Rico and Tina accepted it on his behalf.

Personal life
Both of Gerussi's children went on to work in film and television. His daughter, Tina Gerussi, is a casting director. His son, Rico Gerussi, is an assistant director as well as a lead guitarist/vocalist in R&B band The Raging Butanes in Toronto.

Filmography
 1953 "Herring Hunt" as 
 1962 Alexander Galt: The Stubborn Idealist (movie) as
 1962 Twelfth Night (TV) as 
 1967 Do Not Fold, Staple, Spindle or Mutilate (movie) as
 1972-1990 The Beachcombers (CBC Television dramatic series) as Nick Adonidas
 1975-1987 Celebrity Cooks (CBC Television 1975-1979 and Global 1980-1987 daytime series and one season in prime time with Global) as host
 1980 The Newcomers ("1978" episode; limited TV series) as
 1987 Moving Day (TV movie) as
 1989 The Raccoons episode "The Phantom of Sneer Mansion" as Edward Miller / The Phantom
 1991 The Hitman (movie) as Nino Scarlini
 1995 Prince for a Day (TV movie) as Guido Bitando
 1995 "Under My Skin" (TV movie) as

References

External links

Bruno Gerussi profile on northernstars.ca
"Bruno Gerussi". The Canadian Encyclopedia.

 

1928 births
1995 deaths
Male actors from Alberta
Male actors from British Columbia
Canadian male film actors
Canadian people of Italian descent
Canadian male television actors
Canadian male voice actors
People from Medicine Hat
people from New Westminster
20th-century Canadian male actors